Detlef Lewe (20 June 1939, Dortmund – 1 October 2008) was a West German-German sprint canoeist who competed from the late 1950s to the early 1970s.

Sporting career
Competing in four Summer Olympics, Lewe earned two medals in the C-1 1000 m event with a silver in 1968 and a bronze in 1972. He also won four canoe sprint world championship medals with three golds (C-1 500 m: 1971, C-1 1000 m: 1966, 1971) and one silver (C-1 1000 m: 1963). Lewe also carried the West German flag at the opening ceremonies of the 1972 Summer Olympics in Munich.

Later in life
After the Olympics, Dortmund-born Lewe moved to Munich and became a butcher, a business he ran until prior to his 2008 death. His shop was located near the Olympic area where the 1972 Summer Olympics were held. Lewe died in Munich after a brief illness.

References

1939 births
2008 deaths
Sportspeople from Dortmund
People from the Province of Westphalia
German male canoeists
Olympic canoeists of the United Team of Germany
Olympic canoeists of West Germany
Olympic silver medalists for West Germany
Olympic bronze medalists for West Germany
Olympic medalists in canoeing
Canoeists at the 1960 Summer Olympics
Canoeists at the 1964 Summer Olympics
Canoeists at the 1968 Summer Olympics
Canoeists at the 1972 Summer Olympics
Medalists at the 1968 Summer Olympics
Medalists at the 1972 Summer Olympics
ICF Canoe Sprint World Championships medalists in Canadian